Ellopion may refer to:
Ellopion (Aetolia), a town of ancient Aetolia
Ellopion of Peparethus, an ancient philosopher